The 2022 Interwetten German Darts Grand Prix was the third of thirteen PDC European Tour events on the 2022 PDC Pro Tour. The tournament took place at Kulturhalle Zenith, Munich from 16 to 18 April 2022. It featured a field of 48 players and £140,000 in prize money, with £25,000 going to the winner.

Michael van Gerwen was the defending champion after defeating Simon Whitlock 8–3 in the 2019 final, but he was whitewashed 7–0 by Luke Humphries in the semi-finals.

Humphries went on to win his first European Tour event, defeating Martin Lukeman 8–2 in the final.

Prize money
The prize money was unchanged from the European Tours of the last 3 years:

 Seeded players who lose in the second round and host nation qualifiers (who qualify automatically as a result of their ranking) who lose in their first match of the event shall not be credited with prize money on any Order of Merit. A player who qualifies as a qualifier, but later becomes a seed due to the withdrawal of one or more other players shall be credited with their prize money on all Orders of Merit regardless of how far they progress in the event.

Qualification and format
The top 16 entrants from the PDC ProTour Order of Merit on 1 February automatically qualified for the event and were seeded in the second round.

The remaining 32 places went to players from six qualifying events – 24 from the Tour Card Holder Qualifier (held on 11 February), two from the Associate Member Qualifier (held on 23 February), the two highest ProTour ranking German players, two from the Host Nation Qualifier (held on 24 February), one from the Nordic & Baltic Associate Member Qualifier (held on 29 January), and one from the East European Associate Member Qualifier (held on 5 March).

Krzysztof Ratajski withdrew after the qualifiers, so Gabriel Clemens was promoted into the seeded positions, and Karel Sedláček received a bye into the second round.

Gerwyn Price withdrew from his second round match due to illness, so Keane Barry received a bye to the third round.

The following players will take part in the tournament:

Top 16
  (second round, withdrew)
  (second round)
  (third round)
  (second round)
  (quarter-finals)
  (second round)
  (semi-finals)
  (second round)
  (third round)
 (third round)
  (third round)
  (second round)
  (semi-finals)
  (champion)
  (second round)
  (second round)

Tour Card Qualifier
  (quarter-finals)
  (first round)
  (second round)
  (third round)
  (second round)
  (first round)
  (second round)
  (first round)
  (first round)
  (first round)
  (second round)
  (third round)
  (second round)
  (first round)
  (second round)
  (first round)
  (first round)
  (third round)
  (first round)
  (first round)
  (runner-up)
  (second round)
  (third round)
  (first round)

Associate Member Qualifier
  (quarter-finals)
  (first round)

Highest Ranked Germans
  (quarter-finals)

Host Nation Qualifier
  (first round)
  (first round)

Nordic & Baltic Qualifier
  (first round)

East European Qualifier
  (second round)

Draw

Notes

References

2022 PDC Pro Tour
2022 PDC European Tour
2022 in German sport
German Darts Grand Prix